Marcos José Falcón Tovar (born 31 March 1982) is a Venezuelan Paralympic judoka who competes in international level events. He is a Paralympic bronze medalist at the 2012 Summer Paralympics and is a four-time Parapan American Games medalist.

References

1982 births
Living people
People from Los Teques
Paralympic judoka of Venezuela
Judoka at the 2008 Summer Paralympics
Judoka at the 2012 Summer Paralympics
Judoka at the 2016 Summer Paralympics
Medalists at the 2012 Summer Paralympics
Medalists at the 2007 Parapan American Games
Medalists at the 2011 Parapan American Games
Medalists at the 2015 Parapan American Games
Medalists at the 2019 Parapan American Games
20th-century Venezuelan people
21st-century Venezuelan people